Ava is a medical technology company that developed the Ava bracelet, a wearable fertility tracker. The Ava bracelet was the first fertility-tracking wearable device.

The device tracks women’s cycles by measuring the wearer’s temperature, heart rate, perfusion, breathing rate, and heart rate variability. Data collected from the bracelet is displayed on an app, and intended to help women manage their reproductive health including conceiving and general health tracking during pregnancy.

The company was founded in Zurich, Switzerland by Lea Von Bidder, Pascal Koenig, Philipp Tholen, and Peter Stein. In September 2015, the company took part in TechCrunch’s Startup Battlefield. In November 2015, Ava raised a $2.6 million funding round led by Swisscom and ZKB. The company began shipping the Ava bracelet to customers in July 2016.

In November 2016, the company raised a $9.7 million Series A funding round. In May 2018, the company announced it had raised $30 million in a series B funding round.

In 2018, co-founder Lea von Bidder stated that at least 1,000 women had given birth after using the Ava bracelet since 2016.

In 2019, actress Claire Holt became a brand ambassador for the company.

References 

Medical technology
Fertility
Women's health